Hana Bajtošová (born 5 March 1984) is a Slovak mountain bike orienteering competitor and World Champion. She won an individual gold medal at the 2008 and 2009 World MTB Orienteering Championships.

References

External links
 Hana Bajtošová at World of O Runners

Slovak orienteers
Female orienteers
Slovak female cyclists
Mountain bike orienteers
1984 births
Living people